The 1893 Atlantic hurricane season ran through the summer and the first half of fall in 1893.  The 1893 season was fairly active, with 12 tropical storms forming, 10 of which became hurricanes. Of those, five became major hurricanes. This season proved to be a very deadly season, with two different hurricanes each causing over 2,000 deaths in the United States; at the time, the season was the deadliest in U.S. history. The season was one of two seasons on record to see four Atlantic hurricanes active simultaneously, along with the 1998 Atlantic hurricane season. Additionally, August 15, 1893 was the only time since the advent of modern record keeping that three storms have formed on the same day (Hurricanes Four, Five, and Six) until 2020 saw Wilfred, Alpha, and Beta forming on the same day.

Timeline

Systems

Hurricane One

Observations from ships indicated the presence of a tropical storm in the Bay of Campeche on June 12. The storm moved northeastward across the Gulf of Mexico and intensified into a strong tropical storm. Around 23:00 UTC on June 15, the system made landfall southwest of Perry, Florida, with winds of 70 mph (110 km/h). The cyclone weakened somewhat while moving over Florida and coastal portions of Georgia and the Carolinas. After emerging into the Atlantic near the North Carolina–Virginia state line early on June 17, the storm strengthened, reaching hurricane intensity later that day. On June 19, a ship located in the vicinity of the storm recorded a barometric pressure around  - the lowest in relation to the cyclone.

Several locations in the Southeastern United States observed tropical storm-force winds, with the strongest recorded sustained wind speed being  in Charleston, South Carolina.

Hurricane Two

The system intensified steadily while moving northwestward, becoming a hurricane around 12:00 UTC on the following day. About six hours later, the storm intensified into a Category 2 hurricane and peaked with winds of 100 mph (155 km/h). The hurricane then made landfall near the Nicaragua–Honduras border. The cyclone weakened back to a Category 1 before re-emerging into the Caribbean off the north coast of Honduras early on July 6. Continuing northwestward, the system then re-strengthened slightly, reaching winds of 90 mph (150 km/h) prior to making landfall in northern Belize around 00:00 UTC on July 7. The cyclone weakened rapidly over the Yucatán Peninsula and dissipated just offshore Tabasco several hours later.

The storm sank several ships, including many steamers loaded with fruit in Honduras. About 6,000 bunches of bananas awaiting shipment were washed away at Bonito, while fruit plantations also experienced extensive damage. A number of homes on Roatán were also severely damaged. The hurricane reportedly caused a large loss of life. It has been paleotempestologically traced in sediment near Gales Point in Belize.

Hurricane Three

Hurricane San Roque of 1893

The third storm of the season formed on August 13 east of the Lesser Antilles. It steadily strengthened to a hurricane while moving over the Leeward Islands. While approaching Puerto Rico on August 16, its winds increased to major hurricane status before landfall at Patillas. It crossed the island and exited near Isabela. There were heavy rains over the island of Puerto Rico and damages to the agricultural crops, especially coffee. In San Juan 2.36 inches of rain were reported.  The eye remained over Puerto Rico for a period of seven hours. The lowest barometric pressure reading recorded in San Juan was 29.17 inches. Four deaths were reported. This was the first hurricane in Puerto Rico where flags were used to alert the public about the danger of an approaching hurricane; they were flown from government buildings.

Although landfall weakened the storm, the storm regained major hurricane status as it approached the Bahamas. It then re curved northward and on August 22, made landfall in St. Margaret's Bay near Halifax, Nova Scotia as a non-tropical category 1. The storm was known in Nova Scotia as "the second Great August Gale" and claimed 25 lives, including the sinking of the vessels "Dorcas" and "Etta Stewart."

This hurricane was one of four active hurricanes on August 22.

Hurricane Four

The New York Hurricane of 1893

Hurricane Five

Hurricane Six

 The Sea Islands Hurricane of 1893

Hurricane Seven

        
At least five people died.

Hurricane Eight

Hurricane Nine

The Great Charleston Hurricane of 1893 
The 9th storm of the season was formed southwest of Cape Verde on September 25. It moved westward for the first 8 days of its life then it moved more northwestward. During this time it strengthened to a major hurricane, and it maintained its strength until landfall. As it bypassed the Bahamas, it moved more northward, and made landfall near Myrtle Beach, South Carolina on October 13 with winds around 120 mph (190 km/h). It moved through North Carolina and the Appalachian Mountains, was still a Category 1 Hurricane as it passed 60 miles west of Washington, D.C. It became extratropical on October 14. The center crossed middle of Lake Ontario causing major damage in Lake Erie and Buffalo, New York. 10 ships lost and 29 stranded with 54 lives lost in the Lakes ship wrecks alone.

The hurricane had an estimated Accumulated Cyclone Energy of 63.5, one of the highest of any historical Atlantic hurricane. This storm lasted 19.25 days making it the 10th longest-lasting in Atlantic tropical cyclone on record since records began in 1851.

Hurricane Ten

 The Cheniere Caminada Hurricane

Tropical Storm Eleven

Tropical Storm Twelve

See also 

 List of tropical cyclones
 Atlantic hurricane season

References

External links
 Monthly Weather Review
HURDAT Data for the 1893 Atlantic hurricane season

 
Articles which contain graphical timelines